Christopher Koderisch (born 25 November 1984) is a German former professional tennis player.

Koderisch, known as "Toto", comes from the North Rhine-Westphalia town of Lemgo and trained out of Halle, turning professional in 2003 after graduating high school. 

Most of his career was spent at ITF Futures level but he made an ATP Tour main draw appearance in 2003, as a wildcard at the Gerry Weber Open in Halle, where he was beaten in the first round by the fifth seeded Younes El Aynaoui.

Later a student at Bielefeld University, Koderisch represented Germany at the 2011 Summer Universiade in Shenzhen.

Koderisch had an on screen role as a tennis player in the 2018 French film Amanda and was a consultant for an RTL television film biopic Der Spieler about Boris Becker.

ITF Futures titles

Doubles: (1)

References

External links
 
 

1984 births
Living people
German male tennis players
People from Lemgo
Sportspeople from Detmold (region)
Tennis people from North Rhine-Westphalia
Bielefeld University alumni
Competitors at the 2011 Summer Universiade